Jellied eels are a traditional English dish that originated in the 18th century, primarily in the East End of London. The dish consists of chopped eels boiled in a spiced stock that is allowed to cool and set, forming a jelly. It is usually served cold.

History

Eels were historically a cheap, nutritious, and readily available food source for the people of London; European eels were once so common in the Thames that nets were set as far upriver as London itself, and eels became a staple for London's poor. The earliest known eel, pie and mash houses opened in London in the 18th century, and the oldest surviving shop, M Manze, has been open since 1902. At the end of the Second World War, there were around 100 eel, pie and mash houses in London. In 1995, there were 87.

In the present day, there are relatively few eel, pie and mash shops still in existence, although jellied eels are sold in some of the capital's delicatessen shops and supermarkets. The water quality of the Thames, having improved greatly since the 1960s, has since become suitable once again for recolonisation by eels. The Environment Agency supports a Thames fishery, allowing nets as far upriver as Tower Bridge.

Preparation

Jellied eels are traditionally prepared using the European eels native to Britain. Typically, the eels are chopped (shucked) into rounds and boiled in water and vinegar to make a fish stock with nutmeg and lemon juice, before being allowed to cool. The eel is a naturally gelatinous fish, with the cooking process releasing proteins, like collagen, into the liquid, which solidify upon cooling to form a jelly, though gelatin may be added in order to aid this process. 

Recipes for jellied eels are individual to particular London pie and mash shops, and also street sellers; however, traditional recipes for authentic Victorian jellied eels all have common ingredients and cooking methods, with variation only in the choice of herbs and spices used to flavour the dish.

Jellied eels are often sold with pie and mash, another traditional East End food, and eaten with chilli vinegar or with malt vinegar and white pepper.

Outside the UK
The dish is also consumed in other parts of Europe, including Denmark, Sweden, France, Germany, Poland, Belgium and the Netherlands.

References

Further reading
 http://www.bbc.co.uk/dna/h2g2/A8573132 Background
 https://www.theguardian.com/netnotes/article/0,6729,680948,00.html Jellied eels story at The Guardian, 8 April 2002
 Would you Adam and Eve it? Jellied eels hit by over-fishing London Evening Standard, 3 January 2012.

External links

English cuisine
French cuisine
Belgian cuisine
Dutch cuisine
German cuisine
Swedish cuisine
Danish cuisine
Polish cuisine
Jams and jellies
Working-class culture in England
British seafood dishes